Abney is an  English surname, which evolved in spelling from the surname D'Aubigny. The name originated from meaning "of" or "from" Saint-Aubin-d'Aubigné (now in Ille-et-Vilaine department). Notable people with the surname include:

Derek Abney (born 1980), American footballer
Don Abney (1923–2000), American jazz pianist
Larry Abney (born 1977), American basketball player
Mary Abney (1676–1750), English aristocrat
Sir Thomas Abney (1640–1722), Lord Mayor of London
Thomas Abney (judge) (1690 or 1691 – 1750), English barrister and judge
William de Wiveleslie Abney (1844–1920), English chemist and educationist

See also
Abney (disambiguation)
Abney-Hastings

English-language surnames